Them Firewater Boyz Vol. 1 is the debut studio album by American rapper and a record producer David Banner. It was released independently on August 15, 2000, by Big Face Entertainment. The album features guest appearances from fellow American rappers such as Pimp C, Fiend, Devin the Dude, Kamikaze (of the Crooked Lettaz), Bone Crusher, Polow (now Polow da Don), Young Bleed and Noreaga, among others.

Track listing 
All songs produced by David Banner.

Notes
"Get Crunk", "Trill" & "Firewater" all previously appeared on the Crooked Lettaz album Grey Skies which was released a little over a year before Them Firewater Boyz, Volume 1 on April 20, 1999.

References

2000 debut albums
David Banner albums
Albums produced by David Banner